Maximiliano Ezequiel dos Santos or simply Max Santos or Pardalzinho (born 14 May 1987) is a Brazilian football forward. He currently plays for Ipatinga.

On 26 January 2011, he joined Palmeiras.

References

1987 births
Living people
Brazilian footballers
Vila Nova Futebol Clube players
Sociedade Esportiva Palmeiras players
Goiás Esporte Clube players
Guarani FC players
Ipatinga Futebol Clube players
Association football forwards